Water from Your Eyes is an American indie pop band. The duo consists of Rachel Brown and Nate Amos.

History
Amos and Brown are longtime music collaborators. The duo released their first album Long Days No Dream in 2017. In 2018, the duo released their second album titled All a Dance. The duo released their third album Somebody Else's Song in 2019.  The duo’s latest album, Structure, was released in 2021. In January 2023, the band announced they had signed to Matador Records. Their forthcoming album through the label, Everyone's Crushed, will be released on May 26.

References

Musical groups from the United States with local place of origin missing
American pop music duos